John Joseph Cantwell (December 1, 1874 – October 30, 1947) was an Irish-born American prelate of the Catholic Church. He led the Archdiocese of Los Angeles from 1917 until his death in 1947, becoming its first archbishop in 1936. Cantwell was critical of the U.S. film industry and helped found the National Legion of Decency.

Early life and education
John Cantwell was born in Limerick, on December 1, 1874, to Patrick and Ellen (née O'Donnell) Cantwell. He was the eldest of fifteen children, ten of whom survived into adulthood. Three of his brothers also became priests and served in California, while one sister became an Ursuline nun and remained in Ireland.

Cantwell was raised in Fethard, County Tipperary, where he received his early education at the Monastery National School run by the Patrician Brothers and later the nearby Classical Academy. In 1884, he entered Sacred Heart College, a Jesuit day school in Limerick, while living with his maternal grandparents. During his studies there, his uncle William J. O'Donnell served as Mayor of Limerick in 1890.

From Limerick, Cantwell began his theological studies at St. Patrick's College, Thurles, one of Ireland's missionary seminaries, in 1892. He spent the following seven years there preparing for the priesthood, and was convinced by a friend to apply for the Archdiocese of San Francisco.

Priesthood
Cantwell was ordained a priest on June 18, 1899 by Bishop Robert Browne at the Cathedral of the Assumption, Thurles. The 24-year-old priest sailed from Queenstown on August 3 that year, arriving in Philadelphia two weeks later. In addition to four of his brothers, Cantwell's widowed mother and his sister Nellie came to the United States in the 1920s and lived with him at the episcopal residence in Los Angeles.

Upon his arrival in California in late 1899, Cantwell was appointed an assistant pastor to Father Michael O'Riordan, a fellow native of Limerick, at St. Joseph the Worker Church in Berkeley. While serving in the college town, he organized a Newman Club at the University of California and served as the group's first chaplain in addition to his parish duties. The club lacked a chapel in its early years and used a bakery on Shattuck Avenue as a meeting place.

Cantwell's work with the Newman Club favorably impressed Archbishop Patrick William Riordan, who named Cantwell as his personal secretary in September 1904. Cantwell's new duties took him to San Francisco and he remained in his position for 11 years. Following Archbishop Riordan's death in December 1914, Cantwell was appointed vicar general of the Archdiocese by Riordan's successor, Edward Joseph Hanna, in July 1915.

Episcopal career

Bishop Thomas James Conaty died in September 1915, leaving vacant the Diocese of Monterey-Los Angeles. Bishop John Joseph McCort, an auxiliary bishop of the Archdiocese of Philadelphia, was named to succeed Conaty in June 1916, but declined the appointment so he could continue to assist the ailing Archbishop Edmond Francis Prendergast. Bishop Peter Muldoon of the Diocese of Rockford was next appointed in March 1917 but, even after the papal bull of appointment arrived, he asked Pope Benedict XV to withdraw his nomination. Archbishop Hanna advocated for his vicar general and, after a two-year vacancy, Cantwell was appointed Bishop of Monterey-Los Angeles on September 21, 1917.

On December 5, 1917, four days after his forty-third birthday, Cantwell received his episcopal consecration from Archbishop Hanna, with Bishops Thomas Grace and Joseph Sarsfield Glass serving as co-consecrators, at St. Mary's Cathedral in San Francisco. He formally took charge of the Diocese of Monterey-Los Angeles on the following December 12, when he was installed at the Cathedral of Saint Vibiana. Taking office amid World War I, Cantwell, at his installation, declared, "The men of Christ will be found mustered under one flag, a flag that is sustained by Christian principles, and the men of paganism will be found under that flag of paganism—and we will go on to victory."

Cantwell's diocese was divided twice during his 30 years in office. On June 1, 1922, Pope Pius XI established the Diocese of Monterey-Fresno, and Cantwell was named Bishop of Los Angeles-San Diego. On July 11, 1936, the diocese was split again into the Diocese of San Diego and the Archdiocese of Los Angeles, with Cantwell being promoted to Archbishop. The Archdiocese of Los Angeles was established as a distinct ecclesiastical province from the Archdiocese of San Francisco, making California the only U.S. state to have two metropolitan archbishops at the time (Texas would achieve the same distinction in 2004).

A few months after his elevation, in late October 1936, Cantwell hosted Eugenio Pacelli, then Cardinal Secretary of State, during the latter's stop in Los Angeles as part of his visit to the United States. Pacelli, who was elected Pope Pius XII three years later, declared that he was "particularly impressed with" Cantwell and "the work that has been accomplished in Southern California." On December 3 that year, Cantwell was officially enthroned as Archbishop at St. Vibiana's Cathedral. In his first public address as Archbishop, Cantwell warned about the threat of communism: "If religion ceases to function, if religious influences are allowed to die, then the work of the Communist, the Bolshevist, and the godless will prosper."

Cantwell's tenure was a period of growth for the Catholic Church in Southern California. At the beginning of his administration in 1917, the Diocese of Monterey-Los Angeles had a Catholic population of 180,000 with 276 priests, 128 parishes, 85 missions, 93 stations, and 44 parochial schools with 9,000 students. By the time of his death in 1947, the Archdiocese of Los Angeles had a Catholic population of 601,200 with 688 priests, 217 parishes, 44 missions, 20 stations, four Catholic colleges and universities with 2,350 total students, 35 Catholic high schools with 8,673 total students, and 115 Catholic elementary schools with 38,821 total students. Cantwell established a minor seminary (now Daniel Murphy High School) in 1927 and St. John's Seminary in 1938.

Mexican and Black relations
Between 1925 and 1926 alone, approximately 80,000 Mexican refugees fled the Cristero War and settled in Southern California. In response to this influx, Cantwell declared, "We, in Los Angeles, so close to the Mexican border...cannot be indifferent to the dreadful persecution which is now being waged not only against the Catholic Church but against the most fundamental principles of Christianity."

Cantwell required his priests and seminarians to learn Spanish to serve the diocese's Mexican parishioners, and, from 1926 to 1929, the diocese's Catholic Welfare Bureau (which replaced the Bureau of Catholic Charities) dedicated more than half of its total funds to Mexican Americans. By 1936, Cantwell estimated there were over 182,000 Mexican-born Catholics in his diocese, along with 126 churches and 78 priests exclusively dedicated to their spiritual care.

Cantwell was deeply concerned by the proselytizing efforts of Protestants among Mexican Americans, condemning their work "to tear out of the heart of the foreigner the religion which he has and which alone will save him from becoming an anarchist." As a result, he established the Confraternity of Christian Doctrine in the diocese in 1922, mainly to supplement the religious instruction given at the Catholic settlement houses for Mexican immigrants. During the program's first four months, about 200 Mexican children were taught in a movie theater by the Holy Family Sisters and lay volunteers; this grew to 28,500 children with 211 centers and 1,279 teachers within the next 13 years.

In 1928, Cantwell rebuked a Los Angeles priest who had been accused of speaking "in opprobrious terms of the Mexican people." He pointed out that "many Mexicans who have come among us have given up their homes, their businesses, and their farms" due to persecution and concluded by saying that "to treat these people harshly is unpriestly."

In recognition of his work among Mexican Americans, Cantwell was given the title of Assistant to the papal throne by Pope Pius XI in September 1929 and was awarded the Golden Rose by the canons of the Basilica of Our Lady of Guadalupe in December 1930. He became the first American bishop to celebrate Mass in Mexico when, in October 1941, he performed services at the Basilica of Our Lady of Guadalupe.

In December 1921, Cantwell was invited to be the guest of honor at a meeting of the NAACP. During his address, he noted that the Ku Klux Klan had persecuted both Blacks and Catholics, and expressed his strong support for the civil rights:

Film industry
Based in the heart of the film industry, Cantwell became convinced that the industry was causing a moral decline. Seeking "to form some sort of organization amongst the Catholic picture people of Los Angeles," he founded the Catholic Motion Picture Actors Guild of America in June 1923. The first president and vice-president of the Guild were Thomas Meighan and Jackie Coogan, respectively. The Guild originally met in the parish hall of Blessed Sacrament Church before establishing the Church of the Good Shepherd in December 1924. However, the Guild failed to gain influence within the industry and was viewed as little more than a social club.

In 1932, Cantwell was introduced to Joseph Breen, a lay Catholic who worked for Will H. Hays at the Motion Picture Producers and Distributors of America. While still working for Hays, Breen became Cantwell's close adviser on forcing the industry to accept more stringent self-censorship. Cantwell opposed government intervention and "any attempt to legislate morality in people," so Breen persuaded him to propose that his fellow bishops take action against the industry at the annual meeting of the National Catholic Welfare Council (NCWC) in November 1933.

Ahead of the bishops' meeting, Cantwell began to personally pressure studio executives at Metro-Goldwyn-Mayer and Paramount Pictures for stricter standards, but believed their promises would "amount to very little” unless they felt economic pressure. He enlisted the help of Amadeo Giannini, the Catholic president of the Bank of America and a major lender to Hollywood studios, by vowing to condemn anyone associated with film production (including Bank of America), which led Giannini to warn his clients that the bank would no longer "finance their products if...the Catholic Church were to come out in opposition to their business." Cantwell also recruited prominent attorney Joseph Scott to liaise with Hollywood producers and warn that the bishops would launch a campaign against them unless they reformed.

At the NCWC meeting in November, Cantwell delivered a speech against the film industry, which was largely written by Breen. Cantwell told his fellow bishops that films were "preaching a philosophy of life which, in most instances, is...sinister and insidious" and "lowered both the public and private standards of conduct of all who see them." In particular, he condemned The Sign of the Cross and Ann Vickers. He blamed both Jewish studio executives, who "if [they] had any desire to keep the screen free from offensiveness they could do so," and Broadway playwrights from whom "the stories now current on the screen are selected. Seventy-five percent of these authors are pagans." He concluded by saying "that drastic efforts must be launched at once if we are to stave off national disaster."

Following Cantwell's speech, the bishops voted to create an Episcopal Committee on Motion Pictures with Archbishop John T. McNicholas as chairman and Bishops Cantwell, John F. Noll, and Hugh Charles Boyle as members. In June 1934, the Episcopal Committee organized the National Legion of Decency "to arouse millions of Americans to a consciousness of the dangers of salacious and immoral pictures and to take action against them." Through the popularity of its rating system and the circulation of membership pledges at church services, the Legion wielded significant influence on the film industry for decades and had millions of members throughout the United States.

In April 1936, Cantwell blessed the first meeting of the Hollywood Anti-Nazi League. He continued to call for movie boycotts, including 1947's Duel in the Sun, which he called "morally offensive and spiritually depressing" and warned that Catholics may not see "with a free conscience."

Later life and death
Cantwell celebrated his silver jubilee as a bishop in December 1942, receiving congratulatory messages from Pope Pius XII and President Franklin D. Roosevelt. He was active in the relief effort following World War II and condemned the imprisonment of Archbishop Aloysius Stepinac.

Two weeks after being stricken with a throat infection, Cantwell died on October 30, 1947 at Queen of Angels Hospital. He received tributes from Mayor Fletcher Bowron, Episcopal bishop Robert Burton Gooden, and actors like Bing Crosby, Bob Hope, Eddie Cantor, and Pat O'Brien.

In popular culture
Archbishop Cantwell appears as a character in James Ellroy's novel Perfidia (2014), as Fascist sympathizer and close friend of Dudley Smith.

References

Sources
 
 
 
 
 

1874 births
1947 deaths
Irish emigrants to the United States (before 1923)
Alumni of St. Patrick's College, Thurles
20th-century Roman Catholic archbishops in the United States
American Roman Catholic clergy of Irish descent
University of California, Berkeley people
Burials at the Cathedral of Our Lady of the Angels
Clergy from Limerick (city)
Roman Catholic archbishops of Los Angeles